Open Skies, Closed Minds, a book on ufology, expresses the views of Nick Pope, a former UFO investigator with the British Ministry of Defence (MOD).

The book provides an overview of the UFO phenomenon, with the emphasis on Pope's three-year tour of duty as the Ministry of Defence's UFO desk officer. It examines a number of well-known UFO cases, including the Roswell crash and the Rendlesham Forest Incident, as well as a number of less well-known cases from the MOD's UFO case-files. Pope also discusses the politics surrounding the way in which those within government and the military view UFO phenomena.

References

Books about extraterrestrial life

it:Open Skies, Closed Minds